Remixed Remade Remodeled: The Remix Project is a remix album of recordings by Blondie released by Chrysalis/EMI Records in the US and the UK in 1995 as part of EMI's Brilliant series. The album spun off four remix singles in the US: "Atomic", "Rapture", "Heart of Glass" and "Union City Blue".

By August 9, 2005, it had sold 89,000 copies in United States.

Track listing

Personnel
 Original producer - Mike Chapman (1–7, 9–11); Giorgio Moroder (8)
 Mastered by Chris Gehringer
 Producer - Vinny Vero

"Heart of Glass" (Richie Jones Club Mix):
 Engineer - "Ghetto" Dan Hetzel
 Programmer - Eric Kupper, Richie Jones

"Dreaming" (The Sub-Urban Dream Mix):
 Engineer, programmer - Matthias Heilbronn, Tommy Musto
 Keyboards - Mac Quayle

"Atomic" (Diddy's 12" Mix):
 Engineer - Republica

"The Tide Is High" (Sand Dollar Mix):
 Engineer, mixer - Guido Osorio

"Dreaming" (Utah Saints Mix):
 Engineer - Phil Evans
 Remix engineer - Guy Hatton

"Atomic" (Armand's Short Circuit Mix):
 Editor - Jeff Federman

References

Blondie (band) compilation albums
1995 remix albums
Chrysalis Records remix albums
EMI Records remix albums